Kristian Jaksch (born 7 October 1994) is a former professional Australian rules footballer who played for the Greater Western Sydney Giants and Carlton Football Club in the Australian Football League (AFL). He was a versatile key position player who could play both in the forward line and as a defender.

Early life

Jaksch was previously a student at Carey Baptist Grammar School and played for most of his childhood as a forward. In 2012 he played in the TAC Cup for the Oakleigh Chargers as a defender, and he was selected with the twelfth in the 2012 AFL draft by Greater Western Sydney.

AFL career

Greater Western Sydney (2013–2014)

Jaksch had a knee injury early in 2013 which limited his opportunities, and he made his debut in round 22 against , the team he grew up supporting. He kicked a goal with his first kick.

Carlton (2015–2017)

In his first pre-season at Carlton, Jaksch injured his left foot, causing him to miss out on two months of training. He returned to training in February, but after making his debut for Carlton in round 1, 2015 against , he suffered two broken ribs which sidelined him again. His injury troubles continued when he injured his ankle later in the season. Jaksch was delisted by Carlton at the end of the 2017 season.

Player profile

Jaksch was known as a key position player who could play either in the forward line or as a key defender. He started his career as a forward, but began to also play as a defender when he was playing in the TAC Cup, showing versatility which helped him to get drafted as a first round pick. He was also a strong mark overhead.

Statistics
Statistics are correct to end of the 2017 season

|- style="background:#eaeaea;"
! scope="row" style="text-align:center" | 2013
|style="text-align:center;"|
| 34 || 2 || 1 || 0 || 10 || 5 || 15 || 8 || 1 || 0.5 || 0.0 || 5.0 || 2.5 || 7.5 || 4.0 || 0.5
|-
! scope="row" style="text-align:center" | 2014
|style="text-align:center;"|
| 34 || 5 || 1 || 1 || 33 || 13 || 46 || 13 || 7 || 0.2 || 0.2 || 6.6 || 2.6 || 9.2 || 2.6 || 1.4
|- style="background:#eaeaea;"
! scope="row" style="text-align:center" | 2015
|style="text-align:center;"|
| 18 || 6 || 1 || 2 || 39 || 23 || 62 || 26 || 8 || 0.2 || 0.3 || 6.5 || 3.8 || 10.3 || 4.3 || 1.3
|-
! scope="row" style="text-align:center" | 2016
|style="text-align:center;"|
| 18 || 1 || 0 || 0 || 7 || 1 || 8 || 2 || 2 || 0.0 || 0.0 || 7.0 || 1.0 || 8.0 || 2.0 || 2.0
|- style="background:#eaeaea;"
! scope="row" style="text-align:center" | 2017
|style="text-align:center;"|
| 18 || 0 || colspan=14|
|- class="sortbottom"
! colspan=3| Career
! 14
! 3
! 3
! 89
! 42
! 131
! 49
! 18
! 0.2
! 0.2
! 6.4
! 3.0
! 9.4
! 3.5
! 1.3
|}

References

External links

1994 births
Living people
Greater Western Sydney Giants players
Oakleigh Chargers players
People educated at Carey Baptist Grammar School
Australian rules footballers from Victoria (Australia)
Carlton Football Club players
Preston Football Club (VFA) players